Julien Maurin is a French rally driver.

Results

IRC results

WRC Results

SWRC results

External links

Julien Maurin’s profile at ewrc-results.com

Living people
French rally drivers
World Rally Championship drivers
Intercontinental Rally Challenge drivers
Year of birth missing (living people)